The first season of Cold Case, an American television series, began airing on September 28, 2003. Cold Case is a drama about Lilly Rush, an enigmatic and highly effective detective on the Philadelphia Homicide Squad. Rush's instinctive understanding of the criminal mind and her singular passion for uncovering the truth makes her the perfect fit for investigating cold cases, yester-crimes that have remained unsolved – some only a few months old, others going back decades. Rush and her team use their wits to take on aging evidence and witnesses with buried secrets, uncovering fresh clues, digging into old wounds and doggedly pursuing the truth. Joining Rush on her mission are a team of talented detectives: Scotty Valens, Rush's confident and street-smart partner; Nick Vera, rough around the edges but a sharp investigator; Will Jeffries, an experienced veteran who's been around the block; Kat Miller, no-nonsense and resourceful; and Lieutenant John Stillman, Rush's mentor and sometime father figure. With their assistance, Rush is able to take on the toughest cases, giving voice to victims unable to speak for themselves – making sure none is ever forgotten. Season one regular cast members include Kathryn Morris, Danny Pino, John Finn, Thom Barry and Jeremy Ratchford. In 3 episodes, Justin Chambers had played Chris Lassing, Lilly's partner on the Philadelphia Homicide Squad, but left the show to star as Alex Karev in ABC's hit drama show Grey's Anatomy.

Characters

Episodes

References

2003 American television seasons
2004 American television seasons
Cold Case seasons